Dean Slater (born 1974) is a British strongman competitor, notable for having won the England's Strongest Man title in 2010.

Biography 
Dean Slater was born in Warwickshire, England. He began strongman competition at the age of 28 in 2002. By 2005 he had won his first regional title, Midland's Strongest Man. He repeated this feat in 
2008 and 2010. In 2010 he also won the UKSC version of the England's Strongest Man title.

References

1974 births
British strength athletes
English strength athletes
Living people